Tomeček (feminine Tomečková) is a Czech surname. Notable people with the surname include:

Jakub Tomeček (born 1991), Czech sport shooter
Jan Tomeček, (born 1990), Czech ice hockey player 
Lubomír Tomeček, (born 1979) Czech mountain bike orienteer
Nikola Tomečková, (born 1974) Czech javelin thrower
Vojtěch Tomeček (born 1994), Czech professional ice hockey player
Samuel Tomeček (born 1989), Slovak singer

Czech-language surnames